Selina Mae Robinson (born 1964) is a Canadian politician who was elected to the Legislative Assembly of British Columbia in the 2013 provincial election. She represents the electoral district of Coquitlam-Maillardville as a member of the British Columbia New Democratic Party (BC NDP). She has served in the cabinet of British Columbia since 2017, currently as Minister of Post-Secondary Education and Future Skills.

Biography 
Born in Montreal as Selina Dardick, she moved with her parents to Richmond, British Columbia in 1978. After graduating from Simon Fraser University with a master's degree in counselling psychology, she joined the Jewish Family Service Agency, eventually becoming its associate executive director. A resident of Coquitlam since 1994, she worked as a family therapist before entering politics as a member of Coquitlam City Council.

In September 2012, Robinson announced her intention to seek the BC NDP nomination for Coquitlam-Maillardville in the next provincial election; she was acclaimed the NDP's candidate for the riding in November that year. She was initially declared defeated on election night in 2013, with Steve Kim of the BC Liberals deemed winner by 105 votes. However, once absentee ballots were counted, she pulled ahead to win the riding by a 35-vote margin over Kim. A judicial recount confirmed Robinson's victory by a final margin of 41 votes. She served as critic for mental health and addictions, seniors, local government and sports in the NDP shadow cabinet.

In the 2017 provincial election, Robinson once again faced Steve Kim, this time winning by more than 2400 votes. She was subsequently appointed Minister of Municipal Affairs and Housing in the new BC NDP government under Premier John Horgan. Following the resignation of Jinny Sims from cabinet in October 2019, Robinson briefly assumed the role of Minister of Citizens' Services, until Anne Kang took over the position in January 2020.

Following her re-election in 2020, she was appointed Minister of Finance. After Horgan announced his retirement as premier and party leader in 2022, Robinson considered running to replace him before deciding otherwise. On December 7, 2022 she was appointed Minister of Post-Secondary Education and Future Skills by Premier David Eby.

Electoral record

References

British Columbia New Democratic Party MLAs
Women government ministers of Canada
Women MLAs in British Columbia
Finance ministers of British Columbia
Coquitlam city councillors
Living people
Members of the Executive Council of British Columbia
Women municipal councillors in Canada
21st-century Canadian politicians
1964 births
21st-century Canadian women politicians
Female finance ministers
Simon Fraser University alumni